Like several other countries utilizing the parliamentary system, Malaysia employs the use of shadow cabinets to hold the government to account, and to serve as a potential alternate government-in-waiting.

Hamzah Shadow Cabinet (2022-)

Anwar Shadow Cabinet (2021-2022) 
On 9 May 2021, the Pakatan Harapan secretariat has announced the members of nine committees to address issues of the day, given the Perikatan Nasional government's "incompetency" and "inability to lead the country". The committees are Education, Health, Economy, Security, Gender, Youth, Cost-of-Living, Legal, Mobilisation, Plantation and Food Industry, and Communication, Digital and Multimedia. With the Education and Health committee led by Simpang Renggam MP Maszlee Malik and Kuala Selangor MP Dzulkefly Ahmad, respectively. On 24 November 2022, the shadow cabinet was dissolved following the appointment of Anwar as the 10th Prime Minister and the return of PH to the federal government.

1. Education Committee

Dr Maszlee Malik (Chairman), Simpang Renggam MP
Nik Nazmi Nik Ahmad, Setiawangsa MP
Teo Nie Ching, Kulai MP
Datuk Dr Hasan Bahrom, Tampin MP
Natrah Ismail, Sekijang MP
Steven Sim Chee Keong, Bukit Mertajam MP
Rusnah Aluai, Tangga Batu MP

2. Health Committee

Datuk Seri Dr Dzulkefly Ahmad (Chairman), Kuala Selangor MP
Dr Lee Boon Chye, Gopeng MP
Dr Kelvin Yii Lee Wuen, Bandar Kuching MP
Datuk Hatta Ramli, Lumut MP
Sim Tze Tzin, Bayan Baru MP
Dr Ong Kian Ming, Bangi MP
Alice Lau Kiong Yieng, Lanang MP
Dr Siti Mariah Mahmud, Seri Serdang MLA
Dr Norlela Ariffin, Penanti MLA
Veerapan Superamaniam, Repah MLA
Niekmah Adam
Zaliha Mustafa

3. Economy Committee

Wong Chen, Subang MP
Tony Pua, Damansara MP
Datuk Seri Dr Dzulkefly Ahmad, Kuala Selangor MP
Datin Paduka Tan Yee Kew, Wangsa Maju MP
Noor Amin Ahmad, Kangar MP
Ammar Atan
Raja Iskandar Fareez
Syeikh Khuzaifah
E Hun Tan

4. Security Committee

Mohamad Sabu, Kota Raja MP
Datuk Johari Abdul, Sungai Petani MP and Gurun MLA
Syed Ibrahim Syed Noh, Ledang MP
Muhammad Faiz Fadzil, Permatang Pasir MLA
Liew Chin Tong, Perling MLA
Syahredzan Johan

5. Gender Committee

Fuziah Salleh, Kuantan MP
Chong Eng, Padang Lalang MLA
Raj Munni Sabu

6. Youth Committee

Akmal Nasir, Johor Bahru MP
Howard Lee Chuan How, Pasir Pinji MLA
Hasbie Muda

7. Cost-of-Living Committee

Hassan Abdul Karim, Pasir Gudang MP
Datuk Hasanuddin Mohd Yunus, Hulu Langat MP
Chong Chieng Jen, Stampin MP
Natrah Ismail, Sekijang MP
V Sivakumar, Batu Gajah MP
Chan Foong Hin, Kota Kinabalu MP
Cha Kee Chin, Rasah MP

Asmirul Anuar Aris, Kubang Rotan MLA

8. Legal Committee

Mohamed Hanipa Maidin, Sepang MP
William Leong, Selayang MP
Ramkarpal Singh, Bukit Gelugor MP
Sivarasa Rasiah, Sungai Buloh MP
Muhammad Faiz Fadzil, Permatang Pasir MLA
Fadhlina Sidek, Senator
Zulqarnain Lukman

9. Mobilisation Committee

Mohamad Sabu, Kota Raja MP
Datuk Seri Shamsul Iskandar Md. Akin, Hang Tuah Jaya MP
Steven Sim Chee Keong, Bukit Mertajam MP

10. Plantation and Food Industry Committee

Datuk Seri Salahuddin Ayub, Pulai MP
V Sivakumar, Batu Gajah MP
S Kesavan, Sungai Siput MP
Sim Tze Tzin, Bayan Baru MP

11. Communication, Digital and Multimedia Committee

Ahmad Fahmi Fadzil, Lembah Pantai MP
Khalid Samad, Shah Alam MP
Hannah Yeoh, Segambut MP
Wong Shu Qi, Kluang MP
Chan Ming Kai, Alor Setar MP
Loh Ker Chen
Soraya Salim

12. Religion Committee

 Datuk Seri Mujahid Yusof Rawa, Parit Buntar MP
 Fuziah Salleh, Kuantan MP
 Tengku Zulpuri Shah Tengku Puji, Raub MP
 Raj Munni Sabu
 Norashidah Jaafar

Zahid Shadow Cabinet (2018-2020)

See also
Opposition (Malaysia)
Frontbench Committees of Anwar Ibrahim
DAP Spokesperson of the 13th Parliament

Notes

References

Opposition of Malaysia
Politics of Malaysia
Malaysian shadow cabinets
Malaysia